The 2019 elections to Nottingham City Council were held on 2 May 2019 to elect all 55 members to the council across 20 wards.

Overall results
In total, Labour won 50 seats, the Nottingham Independents won 3 and the Conservatives won 2. Turnout was 29%.

|}

Results by ward
Source:

Aspley

Basford

Berridge

Bestwood

Bilborough

Bulwell

Bulwell Forest

Castle

Clifton East

Clifton West

Dales

Hyson Green and Arboretum

Leen Valley

Lenton and Wollaton East

Mapperley

Meadows

Radford

Sherwood

St Ann's

Wollaton West

 Carl James Husted (suspended by the Conservative Party after comparing people who voted for Remain in the 2016 United Kingdom European Union membership referendum to those who voted for the Nazi Party)

By-elections

St. Ann's

Sherwood

References

Nottingham
Nottingham City Council elections
2010s in Nottingham
May 2019 events in the United Kingdom